Shashi Bhusana Charitam is a Sanskrit book which is about the biography of the social reformer Sashi Bhusan Rath, who was born in Surada and about the Royal family of Surada.  It has a short hand representation of various freedom fighters of Odisha and about the scenic beauty of Ganjam district.  It consists of nine chapters.  It was written by Pandit Sri Bhagabat Prasad Dash Sharma, a well known Sanskrit teacher in Surada area.  It was edited with SUBODHINI Sanskrit Commentaries and also with the Odia translation.

Chapter 1
In the 1st chapter, there is a brief description about the Khidishingi kingdom and Khidishingi Royal family.

In the ancient time, there was a ground mix with elevated and even surface. That part was named as Khidishingi kingdom. In that part many primitive tribes (Kandha) had lived and there king was also a Kandha. His name was Patta Mallick. The border of this kingdom was from Hinjilika (Hinjili) to Jaipur (Kalahandi) and Gadapur (Kandhamal) in east–west region and from Ghumusar to Khemundi in north–south region.The capital city of this kingdom was “Patta Mandicca” (Bajrakona Gada). It is situated between Badagada (Ganjam) and Mohana (Gajapati). But now it is destroyed. The tutelary deity of Patta Mallick was Goddess Khambeswari. The four sons of Patta Mallick quarreled among themselves for the crown of Khidishingi. For the result of this matter Patta Mallick wanted to worship his tutelary deity Maa Khambeswari. For the result of this matter, Maa Khambeswari ordered him that, ”On the next morning a worrier (Khyatriya) would come from the west direction sitting on the horse is your successor”. Patta Mallick was very happy to know this result from his dream order. Then, he waited for the new king of Khidishingi.

At that time period, a Khyatriya named as “Sobha Chandra Singh” who was a “Nala” descendant from “Jaipur Royal Family” lived at Nalabarakote. Nalabarakote is situated between Baliguda and G.Udayagiri in Kandhamal district.

Once Sobha Chandra had gone for hunting and saw a white boar. He followed that boar. When he arrived at Patta Mandicca that boar had diminished. At that time Patta Mallick present at that spot and saw this supernatural and rare scene. Patta Mallick told him all matter and agreed to become his successor. Then, that spot where the white boar had diminished Sobha Chandra Singh built there a temple and established Goddess Barahi Devi as his tutelary deity. This temple now still at Siddhapur village which is nearly at Badagada.
On 1880, English Historian T.J.Maltby wrote a book named as “Ganjam District Manual”. It was also reprinted on 1888 by the Govt. Press of Madras. From this book it has known that, this event was held on 1168 A.C. Raja Sobha Chandra Singh ruled Khidishingi from 1168 to 1206 A.C.

After Raja Sobha Chandra his son Purusottam was the king of Khidishingi. Followed by his son Krushna was the king. Then his son Rai Singh, Rai's clever son Preeti Singh, Preeti's son Kirti Singh,  Kirti's son Padmanabha Singh, Padmanabha's son Bikram Singh and after Bikram his son Baliar Singh(Balistha) was the king of Khidishingi.

Partition of Khidishingi
At the time of Raja Baliar Singh a historical decision had decided that decision was about the partition of his kingdom Khidishingi among his four sons. This event was approximately held on 1474 A.C. On this era Gajapati Purusottama Dev (1466-1497) was the king of Utkal. But from “Madras Record” it is known that, Baliar Singh divide his kingdom on 1574 and died on 1645. Madras Record was written by British Government on 1875 by survey of various regions of Madras Presidency such as Ganjam survey.
Baliar Singh has four sons. They are;
 Gangadhara Singh
 Raja Hadu Singh
 Raja Sandhadhanu Singh a.k.a. Abhaya
 Raja Parshuram Singh

1. Gangadhara Singh
On this decision of partition have a reason. When Baliar Singh was the king, his first son Gangadhara was the crown-prince. At that time somehow Gangadhara died.  So, Raja Baliar Singh decided to divide the kingdom. The 1st part of Khidishingi kingdom was “Badagada” which is situated at the south-western part of Khidishingi. The 1st king of this land was Baliar's grandson and the son of Gangadhara “Raja Damana Singh”.

2. Raja Hadu Singh
As per the decision of Raja Baliar Singh the 2nd part of Khidishingi kingdom was “Dharakotta”. It has situated at the east-northern part of Khidishingi. The 1st king of this land was the 2nd son of Baliar Singh “Raja Hadu Singh”.

3. Raja Sandhadhanu Singh (Abhaya)
The 3rd part of Khidishingi kingdom was “Surada”. It has situated at the west-northern part of Khidishingi. The 1st king of this land was the 3rd son of Baliar Singh “Raja Sandhadhanu Singh”.

4. Raja Parshuram Singh
The 4th part of Khidishingi kingdom was “Sheragada”. It has situated at the south-eastern part of Khidishingi. Due to his 4th son was a minor boy Raja Baliar Singh took a role of representative of Sheragada kingdom till death.  After his death “Raja Parshuram Singh” was the king of Sheragada.

Chapter 2
In the 2nd chapter, there is a brief description about Surada Royal Family.

The 1st king of Surada is “Raja Sandhadhanu Singh”. Then his son “Bhagaban Singh” was the king of Surada. Raja Bhagaban was very scholar in his childhood. He knew every scripture, law etc.  After Raja Bhagaban Singh, his son “Harihar Singh” was the king of Surada. He was very kind for people of Surada. Then his son “Krushna Singh” was the king of Surada. Raja Krushna Singh was very intelligent and priest minded man. Then his son “Gopal Singh” was the king of Surada. After Raja Gopal Singh his son “Rai Singh” was the king of Surada.  He was also a kind person. Then his son “Shyama Sundara Singh” (Kamalalochana) was the king of Surada.

Raja Shyama Sundara Singh
Raja Shyama Sundara was very brave, dynamic, kind, popular and very independent king at that time. Under his kingship Ganjam had taken under “Madras Presidency” by British Rule on 1766 as a Zamindari of Ganjam district.  Raja Shyama Sundara didn't want to recognize this administration on Surada kingdom. But he didn't have rashness/boldness against British Rule. He took their order sadly.

“Golkonda Muslims” administrated whole Ganjam from 1571 to 1667 A.C. then from 1667 to 1753 A.C.; Ganjam was under control of “Mughal Empire” which is administrated by “Hyderabad Nijam”. From 1753 to 1759 this land was under control of “France”. From 1766 to 1936 Ganjam was under control of “Madras Presidency”. From 1936 to till now Ganjam have been attach with “Odisha” state.

Raja Shyama Sundara was well determined, patriot who didn't want to behave like orderly of British Rule.  He didn't deposit the specific amount of Royal tax which had determined by British. He knowingly/consciously neglected these things by which he was ill-behaved/ill-mannered by British. But he didn't fear that kind of rule. Raja Shyama Sundara advised people of Surada that to disobedient the British Rule. At that time he acted as fire for vigilance of people against British. So, the people of Surada had awakened for a movement against British Rule establishment. In this way Raja Shyama Sundara took a role of headache for British Raj. The British Administrators thought a cruel way to finish this matter forever. They engaged the Ghumusar king “Bikrama Bhanja” to kill Raja Shyama Sundara. In the other side, Raja Shyama Sundara married to “Rani Satyabhama” the sister of Raja Bikrama Bhanja. So, as the relationship Raja Shyama Sundara was the Brother-in-law of Raja Bikrama Bhanja. But this relation was nothing for Raja Bikrama Bhanja. By the family dispute of Surada Royal Family, conspirator Bikrama Bhanja put a conspiracy among other three brothers of Raja Shyama Sundara. They gave a proposal to go for hunting with Raja Shyama Sundara. They had gone to the foot of the “Bhaliapada hill” near Hukuma village for the hunting purpose. But when they arrived on the top of the hill the associates and brothers of Raja Shyama Sundara kill him wildly by push from the top of the hill. To know this whole matter “Rani Satyabhama” sadly had gone to the Royal Graveyard which is now named as “Sati Padia” near Panchhanan Temple, Surada. Then she gave a curse that,”No one can have this kingdom after my husband who forcibly do this that person lost his everything.” Then she had jumped into funeral fire of his husband. (It was an ancient tradition when husband dead earlier than wife then his wife jumped into the funeral fire of her husband in India.) It was the beginning moment of downfall for Surada Royal Family. After this the people of Surada much awakened against British.

Former collector of Ganjam “Charl Smith” ordered the Commander of “Asika Army Camp” to go with his soldiers to Surada to relax the situation of the movement of people and to agree for the deposit of Royal tax determined by British. By the order of Collector Asika soldiers arrived at Surada in June 1775 and bring out Raja “Gadadhar Singh” (Raja Shyama Sundara's brother) from the throne. They had done an agreement with “Kunjabihari Singh” (Raja Shyama Sundara's brother) and place him as the next king of Surada.

Raja Kunjabihari Singh had “Narayana Raiguru Mahapatra” (1780 - 1856) as his minister. He was the son of “Gobardhana Raiguru Mahapatra”. Gobardhana was the minister of Raja Shyama Sundara. Gobardhana awarded as “Raiguru” by Raja Shyama Sundara. Pandit Narayana Raigura was the writer of “Sri Krushnakeshari” on 1840 which is known as one of the “Nrusingh Purana” of Hindu religion. It is written in Oriya language and simple, soft “MANJULA” commentaries. Sri Krushnakeshari was adopted from Mahadev Dash's “Bishnukeshari Purana” and Dharakotta Raja Krushna Singh's “Mahabharat-o-Harivansha”. Bishnukeshari Purana is also Nrusingh Purana which is in Oriya language. Mahabharat-o-Harivansha was written on 1786 in pure Oriya language.

On 1815, sonless Raja Kunjabihari Singh had died. So, there was confusion for next king of Surada. So, Raja Kunjabihari's wife “Rani Radhamani” took the opportunity and sit on the throne of Surada. Raja Kunjabihari had only a daughter and she married the Shrikara Bhanja son of Lakhmana Bhanja of Ghumusar Royal Family. At that time Shrikara Bhanja lived at Babanapur village near Asika. To saw this all matter sons of Upendra Singh (Shyama Sundara, Radhacharan, Laxmi Narayan, Janardana) had gone to court for the justice.  Upendra Singh was another brother of Raja Kunjabihari.

By the order of court on 1829 Upendra Singh's son Laxmi Narayan Singh was the next king of Surada. Before this matter Upendra Singh and his two sons Shyama Sundara, Radha Charan forcibly had the kingship of Surada. But the violence against British Raj wasn't cool down in kingdom. The sons of Late king Shyama Sundara Singh (Sundara Singh, Mohan Singh and Gopi Singh) had stood against Raja Laxmi Narayan. They supported Rani Radhamani and vigilance the people against Royal tax which was determined by British.
On 1830, Janardana Singh (Upendra's son) driven out the fraudulent king Laxmi Narayan and took the crown of Surada. But the British didn't agree for Janardana Singh as the king of Surada and took this kingdom under the direct control of Ganjam Collector.  Raja Janardana Singh didn't have the capacity for deposit of Royal tax and salary of his co-worker. So, British gave a proclamation for sale by auction of Surada for collection of tax on 1833.

On 1833, the last king of Ghumusar Raja Dhananjaya Bhanja bought the Surada kingdom by Rs. 8000/- and attached his kingdom with Surada. On 1836, the famous Bhanja Royal family had fallen down because their king Dhananjaya was sonless. After this all matter British Govt. had administrated this kingdom (Surada with Ghumusar) under former Collector of Ganjam.

Chapter 3
In the 3rd chapter there is a brief description about “Rushimala Hill”, “Rushikulya River”, “Asika Town”, “Asika Sugar Mill”, “Basudev Praharaj”, “Jau Gada”, “Tara Tarini Temple”, “Lift Irrigation in Purusottamapur area”, “Ganja Town” (Ancient capital of Ganjam district), “Surada Town”, “Jarau River”, “Patama(Padma) River”, “Surada Dam” and about the birth of Shashi Bhusan Rath.

Rushimala Hill
This is a holy hill. Many priests had lived there in past time. Kapila muni (Incarnation of God Bishnu) also lived with his followers and taught him by his holy and valuable advice at this place. Lord Rama walked on this area during his forest living days with Maa Sita and brother Lakhman. It is a “Ritualistic sacrifice” place in this area till now during “Baruni”. This place is now at the “Kandhamal” district of Indian state Odisha. It is 60 km. from Surada and 8 km. from Katinga.

Satya Era

The son of Kardama muni and incarnation of God Bishnu “Kapila muni” advised his mother Debahuti (Intermediate daughter of “Satarupa”) and “Prathama Manu Swayambhuba” about virtue and righteousness at this Rushimala area.

Tretaya Era

Forest lived Lord Rama, Lakhmana, Sita walked in the Northern shore of Rushikulya River to reach at “Panchhabati” through Rushimala Hill.

Dvapara Era

Many priests had done no. of Ritualistic sacrifice at this land.  So, the colour of this land becomes grey.

References 

Sanskrit literature